Aitutaki Airport is the airport for Aitutaki, one of the Cook Islands . The airport was originally constructed by the United States and New Zealand militaries during World War II. The runway was upgraded in 2004.

The terminal building at Aitutaki Airport is a roof with no or few windows. There is a small convenience stall where snacks and drinks can be purchased. Resort meet-and-greet stalls are also inside the terminal. Air Rarotonga serves Aitutaki with Saab 340A and Embraer Bandeirante aircraft.

Airlines and destinations

References

External links

Airports in the Cook Islands
Aitutaki